The  (Latin for 'War of Octavius') was a civil war of the Roman Republic, fought in 87 BC between the two consuls of that year, Gnaeus Octavius and Lucius Cornelius Cinna. Cicero gave it its name after the consul Octavius. It ended either in late 87 BC or early 86 BC and led directly to Sulla's civil war 4 years later.

Hostilities broke out after Octavius opposed Cinna's attempts to distribute all peoples of Italy throughout all voting tribes and to recall the outlawed Gaius Marius from exile. Cinna was ejected from the city following a bloody street fight at the Forum. He began touring Italy to recruit men, while the party of Octavius at Rome replaced him with Lucius Cornelius Merula, a priest of Jupiter, in the consulship. Cinna took control of the Roman army stationed at Nola and was joined by the exiled Marius, whose veterans flocked to their side. Octavius won the support of the two other Roman generals in the field in Italy, Metellus Pius and Pompeius Strabo, while the Samnites, who were formally at war with Rome, joined Cinna. Peter Brunt estimates that Octavius had some 60,000 men at his disposal, and Cinna twice that.

Marius captured and sacked Ostia, cutting off Rome from supplies, and Cinna went on to besiege the city. Cinna's lieutenants Quintus Sertorius and Papirius Carbo fought inconclusively against Pompeius Strabo near the Janiculum. After Strabo died of natural causes, his troops defected to Cinna, forcing the consul Octavius to sue for peace. Cinna and Marius entered Rome and executed their opponents, including Octavius, whereas Merula, the third consul, committed suicide. Cinna, Marius and their supporters dominated affairs in Rome and Italy until Sulla's civil war in 83 BC.

References

Citations

Sources 

 
 
 
 
 
 
 

 
 
 
 
 

80s BC conflicts
1st century BC in Italy
1st century BC in the Roman Republic
Roman Republican civil wars